Djaouida Sellah is a Canadian politician. Sellah represented the riding of Saint-Bruno—Saint-Hubert in the House of Commons from 2011 to 2015. Following her tenure in parliament, she served as president of the New Democratic Party of Quebec in 2018.

Early life and career
Sellah was born in Algiers, Algeria. Her mother was a midwife and her father was killed in the Algerian War of Independence. She was a volunteer doctor for the Red Crescent during the Gulf War in Baghdad. She then went to Kuala Lumpur with her husband who was working as a translator. The two came to Quebec in 1998. Sellah has three children. At the time of her election, she was president of the Association québécoise des médecins diplômés hors Canada et États-Unis, supporting the recognition of qualifications of foreign-trained doctors.

Political career

Federal politics 
Sellah entered politics ahead of the 2011 Canadian federal election seeking the NDP nomination for Longueuil—Pierre-Boucher of which she lost to Pierre Nantel. She was then nominated by the party for the riding of Saint-Bruno—Saint-Hubert and was elected as part of the "Orange Wave" that swept Quebec, defeating three-term Bloc Québécois MP Carole Lavallée. 

Sellah was the first Canadian politician elected who was born in Algeria.(NDP). In parliament, Sellah served on the Health Committee for the 1st session of the 41st Parliament, and she then served on the Standing Committee of the Status of Woment. She also served as the assistant Health Critic for the NDP from 2012 until 2013.

Sellah ran in the 2015 election in the new Riding of Montarville, but placed third behind Liberal Michel Picard, whom she had defeated in 2011. Sellah was once again the NDP's candidate for Montarville for the 2019 election; she came in third with a reduced percentage. She ran for the NDP again in the 2021 Election, but was unsuccessful.

Party politics 
Following the death of Jack Layton, Sellah endorsed Tom Mulcair to be the next leader of the New Democratic Party. Sellah ran for president of the NDP in 2016 to replace Rebecca Blaikie, but ultimately lost to Marit Stiles. In the 2017 NDP leadership election, Sellah supported Charlie Angus.

Provincial politics
Sellah was the president of the New Democratic Party of Quebec during 2018. She was the New Democratic Party of Quebec's candidate in La Pinière for the 2018 Quebec general election.

Electoral record

Federal

Provincial

References

External links
Official Website

Living people
New Democratic Party MPs
Members of the House of Commons of Canada from Quebec
Women members of the House of Commons of Canada
Algerian emigrants to Canada
Immigrants to Quebec
People from Algiers
People from Longueuil
Physicians from Quebec
21st-century Canadian politicians
21st-century Canadian women politicians
Year of birth missing (living people)